Transgressions: A Journal of Urban Exploration was a British magazine founded in 1995. Although only four magazines were produced during its lifetime, it was a double-issue (nos 2/3). Its contents reflected the emergence of new forms of psychogeographical activity in the 1990s. A more playful and sensuous direction was charted, nodding more to the situationism of Asger Jorn than Guy Debord, with frequent allusions to the "magico-Marxism" current amongst British groups, such as the reformed London Psychogeographical Association. The first usage of the term "magico-Marxism" appears to have been in this magazine, in 1996.

The magazine also introduced the work of the Italian "situationauts" as well as various psychogeographical initiatives, some of which have a post-avant-garde insistence on "ordinary lives". The magazine was edited by Alastair Bonnett and published by Salamander Press, London. It ended publication in 2001.

References

1995 establishments in the United Kingdom
2001 disestablishments in the United Kingdom
Defunct magazines published in the United Kingdom
Magazines established in 1995
Magazines disestablished in 2001
Magazines published in London
Urban studies and planning magazines
Visual arts magazines published in the United Kingdom